This is a list of films about witchcraft.

0–9

A

B

C

D

E

F

G

H

I

J

K

L

M

N

O

P

R

S

T

U

V

W

Y

See also
 List of films about demons

References

External links
 IMDB – Keyword Witchcraft

witchcraft